Zumbo's Just Desserts is an Australian baking reality competition television program on the Seven Network. The program was developed by the creators of My Kitchen Rules, and is hosted by Adriano Zumbo and Rachel Khoo, with Gigi Falanga as assistant.

A second season was commissioned in August 2018 with Netflix joining as a co-producer. The second season premiered on 17 November 2019. In May 2019, it was announced that Falanga was not returning for season two.

Background
In February 2016, the title of the program was revealed along with naming Zumbo as host. Khoo was named as co-host in April 2016. In June 2016, Falanga was announced as joining the program as assistant and timekeeper and promos were released, advising the show would air after the 2016 Summer Olympics.

Despite poor ratings for the first season, an international release through streaming service Netflix led to a second season being commissioned as a co-production between Netflix and Seven Studios.

Contestants

Season 1

Season 2

Series details

Broadcast
The series aired after the Seven Network's coverage of the 2016 Olympic Games on 22 August 2016. As of April 2018, the series is streaming on Netflix.

Ratings
Ratings data is from OzTAM and represents the average viewership from the 5 largest Australian metropolitan centres (Sydney, Melbourne, Brisbane, Perth and Adelaide).

Season 1

Season 2

References

External links

2016 Australian television series debuts
Australian cooking television series
2010s Australian reality television series
Australian television series revived after cancellation
English-language Netflix original programming
Seven Network original programming
Reality competition television series
Television series by Seven Productions